The Case of the Black Parrot is a 1941 American crime film directed by Noel M. Smith and written by Robert E. Kent. The film stars William Lundigan, Maris Wrixon, Eddie Foy, Jr., Luli Deste, Paul Cavanagh and Charles Waldron. The film was released by Warner Bros. on January 11, 1941.

Plot
Aboard a ship, newspaper reporter Jim Moore falls for passenger Sandy Vantine and meets her uncle Paul, who is in possession of a small wooden chest that he believes could be a copy made by the mysterious Black Parrot, a notorious art forger. Scotland Yard inspector Colonel Piggott is also aboard, presumably on the Parrot's tail.

Jim proposes to Sandy and meets her relatives and family acquaintances. They include Madame de Charierre, the chest's rightful owner, whose maid Julia had been trying to retrieve it because a secret drawer contained compromising love letters. A police constable named Grady arrives and Jim contacts Piggott as well. Paul and another guest quickly end up dead and Piggott quickly declares everyone in the house to be a suspect.

A second hidden compartment contains priceless diamonds. Jim and Sandy realize just in time that Piggott is the Black Parrot who has been pursuing the jewels all along.

Cast 

 William Lundigan as Jim Moore
 Maris Wrixon as Sandy Vantine
 Eddie Foy, Jr. as Tripod Daniels
 Luli Deste as Madame de Charriere
 Paul Cavanagh as Max Armand
 Charles Waldron as Paul Vantine 
 Joseph Crehan as Inspector Grady

 Emory Parnell as Simmonds
 Phyllis Barry as Julia
 Cyril Thornton as George Rogers
 Leyland Hodgson as Parks
 Ernie Stanton as Colonel Piggott
 Cliff Saum as Morel
 Louis Natheaux as Theophile Daurelle (uncredited)

Reception
In a contemporary review for The New York Times, critic Theodore Strauss wrote: "It is complete with standard equipment—a priceless old cabinet with secret drawers, a beribboned packet of scented letters, veiled women bearing a double identity, muffled figures silhouetted at the library window as the clock chimes midnight, and a butler with a guilt complex (probably because all the scenarists are pointing the finger of suspicion at him, but that doesn't fool us any more). But somehow each moment of suspense is merely a prelude to long-winded deductions in the library. In short,  is on the verbose side, though there's no such bird in it."

References

External links 
 
 
 
 

1941 films
Warner Bros. films
American crime films
1941 crime films
Films directed by Noel M. Smith
American black-and-white films
1940s English-language films
1940s American films
Films scored by Bernhard Kaun
Films about journalists